The Yale Journal of Criticism was an academic journal published by the Johns Hopkins University Press which covered all humanities disciplines. It was named best new journal by the Conference of Editors of Learned Journals in 1989 and ceased publication in 2005.

External links
Yale Journal of Criticism at Project MUSE

Biannual journals
English-language journals
Publications disestablished in 2005
Publications established in 1989
Multidisciplinary humanities journals
Magazines published in Baltimore